Tergin Apartment Building, also known as Tergin Apartments , is a historic apartment building located at Jefferson City, Cole County, Missouri. It was built in 1938–1939, and is a two-story brick walkup apartment building with a full basement.  It measures 50 feet wide by 35 feet deep and features Art Deco and Streamline Moderne design elements.

It was listed on the National Register of Historic Places in 1999. It is located in the Missouri State Capitol Historic District.

References

Apartment buildings in Missouri
Individually listed contributing properties to historic districts on the National Register in Missouri
Residential buildings on the National Register of Historic Places in Missouri
Modernist architecture in Missouri
Art Deco architecture in Missouri
Residential buildings completed in 1896
Buildings and structures in Jefferson City, Missouri
National Register of Historic Places in Cole County, Missouri
Apartment buildings on the National Register of Historic Places